Proverbs 14 is the fourteenth chapter of the Book of Proverbs in the Hebrew Bible or the Old Testament of the Christian Bible. The book is a compilation of several wisdom literature collections, with the heading in 1:1 may be intended to regard Solomon as the traditional author of the whole book, but the dates of the individual collections are difficult to determine, and the book probably obtained its final shape in the post-exilic period. This chapter is a part of the second collection of the book.

Text
The original text is written in Hebrew language. This chapter is divided into 35 verses.

Textual witnesses
Some early manuscripts containing the text of this chapter in Hebrew are of the Masoretic Text, which includes the Aleppo Codex (10th century), and Codex Leningradensis (1008). Fragments containing parts of this chapter in Hebrew were found among the Dead Sea Scrolls including 4Q103 (4QProv; 30 BCE – 30 CE) with extant verses 5–10, 12–13, 31–35. 

There is also a translation into Koine Greek known as the Septuagint, made in the last few centuries BC. Extant ancient manuscripts of the Septuagint version include Codex Vaticanus (B; B; 4th century), Codex Sinaiticus (S; BHK: S; 4th century), and Codex Alexandrinus (A; A; 5th century).

Analysis
This chapter belongs to a section regarded as the second collection in the book of Proverbs (comprising Proverbs 10:1–22:16), also called "The First 'Solomonic' Collection" (the second one in Proverbs 25:1–29:27). The collection contains 375 sayings, each of which consists of two parallel phrases, except for Proverbs 19:7 which consists of three parts.

Verse 1
Every wise woman builds her house,
but the foolish pulls it down with her hands.
"Every wise woman”: from the Hebrew construct phrase , khakhmot nashim, "wise ones of women”; with the plural noun , nashim, functions in a distributive sense ("every"), as this is followed by a singular feminine verb , banetah ("builds").
This verse contrasts the wise and foolish women (cf. Proverbs 7:10–23; 31:10–31), but may also be making much the same point as the personified Wisdom building her house in Proverbs 9:1 as the antithesis of Folly and her house in 9:14. Alternative wording is found in the Good News Translation:
Homes are made by the wisdom of women, but are destroyed by foolishness.

Verse 30
A sound heart is the life of the flesh:
but envy the rottenness of the bones.
"Sound": an attributive adjective from the Hebrew genitive noun , marpeʾ, which may be one meaning of two homonyms:
1 "healing", from the root , raphaʾ, "to heal";
2 "calmness, gentleness”, from the root , raphah, "to be slack, loose".
"Envy": from the Hebrew term , qinʾah, "passion" (NRSV), “jealousy” (NAB, NCV, TEV, NLT), a fairly general word for deep emotion of passionate zeal, including envy and jealousy (Proverbs 6:34; 27:4) as well as anger. In a positive sense, it can be a zeal to defend the institutions of the sanctuary, but in a negative sense it can be an 'intense and sometimes violent excitement and desire that is never satisfied'.
This saying correlates the effect of one's state of the mind on the health of one's whole body (cf. Proverbs 3:8).

See also

Related Bible parts: Proverbs 9, Proverbs 16, Proverbs 31

References

Sources

External links
 Jewish translations:
 Mishlei - Proverbs - Chapter 14 (Judaica Press) translation [with Rashi's commentary] at Chabad.org
 Christian translations:
 Online Bible at GospelHall.org (ESV, KJV, Darby, American Standard Version, Bible in Basic English)
 Book of Proverbs Chapter 14 King James Version
  Various versions

14